MSoA or MSOA may refer to:
 Microsoft Access, commonly abbreviated MSOA
 Middle Layer Super Output Area in the ONS coding system
 Motorway service area
 Marijuana Smokers of America, a US (Philadelphia, the Pennsylvania) underground social club founded in the mid 1980s by a teenaged graffiti artist
 Bak Middle School of the Arts

See also
 MSA (disambiguation)